Gammons is a surname. Notable people with the surname include:

 J. A. Gammons (1876–1963), American baseball player
 Peter Gammons (born 1945), American sportswriter, media personality, and musician

See also
 Gammans
 Hammons